Enemy is the second studio album by Kristeen Young, recorded and released in 1999.

Track listing
Music composed by Kristeen Young and Jeff White; lyrics by Kristeen Young
"Year of the Woman" -
"Night Blindness" -
"Take Me" -
"I'm Sorry" -
"Mouth to Mouth" -
"Lucia" -
"Laurel" -
"Skeletons" -
"Sacrifice" -
"The Good Night" -
"Have You Ever Worked With Anything Hi-Tek?" -
"Incubator" -
"Boomerang" -
"Nothing" -
"Enemy" -

Personnel
The Band
Kristeen Young - vocals, keyboards
Brian Ion - bass
"Baby" Jeff White - drums

References

Kristeen Young albums
1999 albums